Dowleta (also Romanized as Dowletā) is a village in Kalashi Rural District, Kalashi District, Javanrud County, Kermanshah Province, Iran. At the 2006 census, its population was 306, in 58 families.

References 

Populated places in Javanrud County